Parliamentary elections were held in the Comoros on 22 November 1992, with a second round on 29 November 1992. Due to electoral irregularities in the initial elections, there were also by-elections in six of the 42 constituencies on 13 and 20 December.

The election was contested by 320 candidates representing 22 parties, although  the Comorian Union for Progress and the National Union for Democracy in the Comoros both boycotted it in protest at the government's refusal to update voting lists and the detention of major politicians. The Union of Democrats for Development emerged as the largest party, although it won only seven seats. Voter turnout was 69.3%.

Results
The results in six seats were annulled. In the subsequent by-elections in December for five of the six seats, the Movement for Democracy and Progress won two seats, with the Comorian Party for Democracy and Progress, the Democratic Front of the Comoros and Twamaya winning one each.

References

Comoros
Elections in the Comoros
Legislative
Election and referendum articles with incomplete results
Comoros